is a major interchange railway station which straddles Tokyo's Chiyoda, Shinjuku and Bunkyō wards. It was originally built as Iidamachi Station (albeit in a slightly different location), terminus of the then Kōbu Railway, precursor to today's Chūō Line. The Ōedo Line addition to the station in 2000 was designed by architect Makoto Sei Watanabe.

Lines 
Iidabashi Station is served by the following above-ground and subway lines.

Above ground
 Chūō-Sōbu Line (JB16)

Subway lines
 Tokyo Metro Tōzai Line (T-06)
 Tokyo Metro Yūrakuchō Line (Y-13)
 Tokyo Metro Namboku Line (N-10)
 Toei Ōedo Line (E-06)

Station layout
The JR East station has one island platform, serving the up and down local lines; there is no platform for the parallel rapid double track (for longer-distance commuter and express Chūō Line trains). The station is located on the inside of the Outer Moat. It is elevated over Mejiro-dori, a major thoroughfare from the Imperial Palace towards Ikebukuro.

JR East

Tokyo Metro

Toei

History
The present-day JR East station opened on 15 November 1928.

The station facilities of the Tozai, Namboku and Yurakucho Lines were inherited by Tokyo Metro after the privatization of the Teito Rapid Transit Authority (TRTA) in 2004.

In 2014, it was announced that the JR East platforms were to be moved and rebuilt approximately 200 m southwest to reduce platform gaps on a sharply curved section of the platform. The new platforms, along with a new west station building, opened on July 12, 2020.

Passenger statistics
In fiscal 2013, the JR East station was used by an average of 91,196 passengers daily (boarding passengers only), making it the 46th-busiest JR East station. Over the same fiscal year, the Tokyo Metro station was used by an average of 173,224 passengers daily (exiting and entering passengers), making it the twelfth-busiest station operated by Tokyo Metro. In fiscal 2013, the Toei station was used by an average of 14,577 passengers daily (boarding passengers only). The average daily passenger figures for JR East and Tokyo Metro in previous years are as shown below.

 Note that JR East figures are for boarding passengers only.

Surrounding area
Koishikawa Kōrakuen Garden can be reached by walking from this station.
The Iidabashi district extends south and west of the station, and the Kagurazaka extends north and east. The station spans the Kanda River, which separates these two neighborhoods and at this point runs from the southwest towards the northeast.

See also

 List of railway stations in Japan

References

External links 

 Iidabashi Station information (JR East) 
 Iidabashi Station information (Tokyo Metro) 
 Iidabashi Station information (Toei) 
 Refurbishment Design concept

Chūō-Sōbu Line
Chūō Main Line
Tokyo Metro Tozai Line
Tokyo Metro Yurakucho Line
Tokyo Metro Namboku Line
Toei Ōedo Line
Stations of East Japan Railway Company
Stations of Tokyo Metro
Stations of Tokyo Metropolitan Bureau of Transportation
Railway stations in Tokyo
Railway stations in Japan opened in 1928